Stanley Carnell (October 14, 1903 – December 29, 1989) was a Canadian politician. He served in the Legislative Assembly of British Columbia from 1956 to 1966, as a Social Credit member for the constituency of South Peace River.

References

British Columbia Social Credit Party MLAs
1903 births
1989 deaths
British emigrants to Canada